Sir John Rogers, 1st Baronet (c. 1649 – 23 April 1710) was an English merchant and Member of Parliament.

He was the eldest son and only surviving child of John Rogers and his wife Elizabeth Payne, daughter of Sir Robert Payne.
 
He became a customs official in Plymouth and then moved to Bristol to engage in the lucrative tobacco trade, becoming a wealthy man. With his fortune he acquired several estates in the Plymouth area such as Cornwood, Ivybridge and Blachford, making Blachford over to his son John on the latter's marriage in 1698.

Rogers became a common councilman in Plymouth and was made an alderman in 1694–96. He entered the English House of Commons as member of parliament (MP) for Plymouth in 1698, representing the constituency for the next two years. He was created a baronet, of Wisdome, in the County of Devon on 21 February 1699 and was appointed High Sheriff of Devon in 1701.

Rogers died in Plymouth and was buried at Charles Church, Plymouth. He had married, in 1696, Mary Vincent, daughter of William Spencer Vincent. He was succeeded in the baronetcy by their only surviving son John.

References

1649 births
1710 deaths
17th-century merchants
Baronets in the Baronetage of England
High Sheriffs of Devon
English MPs 1698–1700
Members of the Parliament of England for Plymouth